The 1992 Cork Intermediate Hurling Championship was the 83rd staging of the Cork Intermediate Hurling Championship since its establishment by the Cork County Board in 1909. The draw for the opening round fixtures took place on 15 December 1991.

On 25 October 1992, Bishopstown won the championship following a 1-09 to 0-09 defeat of CLoyne in the final. This was their first ever championship title.

Cloyne's Philip Cahill was the championship's top scorer with 2-19.

Results

First round

Second round

Quarter-finals

Semi-finals

Final

Championship statistics

Top scorers

Overall

In a single game

References

Cork Intermediate Hurling Championship
Cork Intermediate Hurling Championship